Catagonus metropolitanus is an extinct species of peccary known from the Pleistocene of Argentina.

Taxonomy
Catagonus metropolitanus is notable in that it is the type species of a genus that contains a living species; the Chacoan peccary. The living Chacoan peccary was first described in 1930 from subfossil remains, and only found alive by scientists in 1972 (an example of a Lazarus taxon).

A 2017 study on the phylogenetic systematics of Tayassuidae species suggests that Catagonus should only contain C. metropolitanus. The extinct narrow-headed peccary (C. stenocephalus) should be moved into Brasiliochoerus, while the Chacoan peccary, C. bonaerensis and C. carlesi should be placed in Parachoerus. If this is accepted, then Catagonus becomes an extinct genus once more.

References

Peccaries
Prehistoric even-toed ungulates
Pleistocene even-toed ungulates
Prehistoric mammals of South America
Pleistocene mammals of South America